Year refers to the first year introduced. A range of years is the period the bus was manufactured.

#

A

B

C

D

E

F

G

H

I

J

K

L

M

N

O

P

Q

R

S

T

U

V

W

X

Y

Z

Š

See also 

 Bus spotting
 Coach (used for long-distance travel)
 Dollar van
 List of fictional buses
 List of Leyland buses
 List of AEC buses
 Multi-axle bus
 Trackless train
 Tram
 Single decker buses

References 

 01

Bus